Maxime Pattier (born 12 February 1996) is a French professional footballer who plays as a goalkeeper for  club US Concarneau.

Career
On 6 February 2019, Pattier signed his first professional contract with FC Lorient. He made his professional debut for Lorient in a 2–1 Coupe de la Ligue loss to Le Mans FC on 13 August 2019.

In June 2020, Pattier joined Stade Briochin, newly promoted to Championnat National.

In June 2022, Pattier signed a two-year contract with Concarneau.

References

External links
 
 
 

1996 births
Living people
People from Vitré, Ille-et-Vilaine
Association football goalkeepers
French footballers
Stade Rennais F.C. players
FC Lorient players
Stade Briochin players
US Concarneau players
Championnat National players
Championnat National 2 players
Championnat National 3 players
Footballers from Brittany
Sportspeople from Ille-et-Vilaine